Edward Russell Hobaugh (born June 27, 1934) is a retired American Major League Baseball player. The right-handed pitcher appeared in 61 big league games pitched between 1961 and 1963 for the Washington Senators. He attended Michigan State University.

Hobaugh signed with the Chicago White Sox in 1956, and threw a no-hit game in the Class B Three-I League during his first pro season. He then spent two years (1957–58) serving in the United States Army. After toiling at the Triple-A level for the ChiSox in 1959–60, he was taken by the Senators in the 12th round of the 1960 Major League Baseball expansion draft.

Hobaugh then spent the full season of 1961 and parts of 1962–63 as a member of the Washington MLB pitching staff. He was the starting pitcher in the expansion Senators' fifth official game on April 19, 1961, against the White Sox. Although he lasted only 2 innings in his maiden start, Hobaugh recovered to pitch effectively and hold a spot in Washington's rotation through late July, winning six of 11 decisions and hurling three complete games. He then switched to the bullpen and was primarily a relief pitcher for the remainder of his big-league career. In 1963, Hobaugh began the season in the minor leagues, and apart from a nine-game call-up with the Senators in September, he spent the rest of his pro career in the minors.

In his 61 big-league games pitched, 21 as a starter, Hobaugh compiled a 9–10 win–loss record, allowing 228 hits and 95 bases on balls in 211 innings pitched. He struck out 115 and was credited with one save.

The native of Western Pennsylvania was eventually acquired by the Pittsburgh Pirates and he spent the remainder of his minor-league pitching career with the Pirates, except for a temporary return to the White Sox system. After retiring from the mound in 1969, Hobaugh briefly managed at Class A in the Pirates' organization.

References

External links
, or Retrosheet, or SABR Biography Project

1934 births
Living people
Atlanta Crackers players
Baseball players from Pennsylvania
Columbus Jets players
Indianapolis Indians players
Major League Baseball pitchers
Michigan State Spartans baseball players
Minor league baseball managers
People from Kittanning, Pennsylvania
Rapiños de Occidente players
Rochester Red Wings players
San Diego Padres (minor league) players
Syracuse Chiefs players
Toronto Maple Leafs (International League) players
Tucson Toros players
Washington Senators (1961–1971) players
Waterloo White Hawks players